Yamini Ghantasala is an Indian playback singer who works in Telugu and Tamil films.  Ghantasala started with song Aagayamey in movie called Yaanum Theeyavan in 2016. After that, she recorded ‘Yemaindi’ in Telugu  for movie Rangula Raatnam in Telugu. She also recorded Gira Gira for the film Dear Comrade.

Times of India said about her Song Gira Gira "Yamini’s enticing vocals, with her nailing the local yasa, are a major draw for this number."

References 

Telugu playback singers
Year of birth missing (living people)
Living people